Simon Boyle is a British chef, author and social entrepreneur working in Britain. Boyle became a Fellow of the Royal Academy of Culinary Arts in 2017. In 2020 he was awarded special recognition by the Basque Culinary World Prize for his relief work in London during the COVID-19 crisis.

Life and career
Boyle was born in Glasgow, Scotland and attended Bournemouth and Poole College to start his culinary training. He was awarded the Specialised Chefs Scholarship, arranged by the Royal Academy of Culinary Arts. Sponsored by The Savoy Hotel London, Boyle completed his apprenticeship at the 5* hotel.

He was appointed the first Culinary Ambassador for Unilever in 2002.

After volunteering in Sri Lanka following the 2004 Indian Ocean earthquake and tsunami, Boyle returned to the UK to set up a food events company that also helped homeless people. Boyle appeared on BBC’s Dragons' Den in 2008 to pitch for funding, which was unsuccessful.

In 2010, Boyle formed a partnership between his social enterprise – the Beyond Food Foundation, with PricewaterhouseCoopers, De Vere (hotel operator) and the Homes and Communities Agency, who invested £800,000 in a new restaurant and training concept. The Brigade restaurant and training school in London Bridge has been running since 2010. The concept helps get homeless people off the streets through food training programmes and apprenticeships. All profits of the restaurant are shared with charities and social enterprises.

In 2020, Boyle responded to the Covid-19 pandemic with a number of initiatives to help vulnerable people and hospitality workers facing unemployment and homelessness due to the crisis. He cooked food for disadvantaged communities – an initiative that was awarded special recognition by the Basque Culinary World Prize 2020. He also developed the Made Again programme for Beyond Food, which consisted of virtual coaching workshops to help vulnerable hospitality workers adapt their skills to find employment. Notably, Boyle also created the Feast With Purpose cookbook during the UK Covid-19 lockdown, where he encouraged 140 chefs – including Michel Roux Jnr., Rick Stein, Nathan Outlaw and Tom Kerridge – to create recipes for the book. All proceeds are supporting hospitality workers affected by the Covid-19 crisis.

Recognition
Former prime minister David Cameron and Boris Johnson in his role as Mayor of London have visited Boyle at Brigade. Cameron called Brigade a "most impressive social enterprise". Johnson said: "This is ethical capitalism" and "social enterprise at its best." Boyle's series of supper clubs at Brigade have involved guest chefs including Michel Roux Jr (Le Gavroche), Shay Cooper (The Goring) and Chris King (The Langdown).

In March 2018, Boyle was invited to the House of Commons All Party Parliamentary Group for London to advise the government on how they could better support social enterprises. Boyle said the government's competitive contracting of funding was "soul destroying" and urged the government to do more to recognise the work social enterprises are doing.

Boyle won the People's Choice Award by the Craft Guild of Chefs in 2013. He was awarded an Honorary Diploma and named an Honorary Head of State Chef by Le Club des Chefs des Chefs in 2015. The same year, he also won the Lord Mayor's Dragon Award. In 2016, he was named one of the Top 1,000 Most Influential People in London by the London Evening Standard and in 2017, Boyle won the Education Training and Jobs Business of the Year at the Social Enterprise UK Awards. In 2017, Boyle gained a Royal Academy of Culinary Arts Fellowship. In 2018, Boyle was awarded the prestigious Extra Mile Award at the Foodservice Cateys, and in 2020 he was given special recognition for his relief work in London during the COVID-19 crisis by the Basque Culinary World Prize.

Boyle regularly appears in the media, including the BBC Radio London Robert Elms show, Jazz FM (UK), The Caterer and Produce Business UK. He also judges industry events, including The Teflon Diamond Standard Awards.

Books
 Feast With Purpose, author and contributor, Chef Media, 2020. 
 How to Cook and Keep Cooking, author, Penguin, 2018. 
 How to Find a Job and Keep It, author, Penguin, 2016. 
 The Chef Book, contributor, Peter Marshall publisher, 2015. 
 Recipes for Life: Inspired Cooking Beyond Cancer, contributor, 2013.

References 

Year of birth missing (living people)
Living people
Scottish chefs
British cookbook writers
Businesspeople from Glasgow